The Immature: The Trip is a 2012 comedy film directed by Paolo Genovese, sequel to the 2011 film The Immature.

Cast

References

External links

2012 films
Films directed by Paolo Genovese
2010s Italian-language films
2012 comedy films
Italian comedy films
2010s Italian films